The High Commissioner from New Zealand to Barbados is New Zealand's foremost diplomatic representative in Barbados, and in charge of New Zealand's diplomatic mission in Bridgetown, Barbados.

The High Commission is located in a building shared with the British High Commissioner to Barbados at Lower Collymore Rock Rd. in Bridgetown, Barbados' capital city.  New Zealand has maintained a resident High Commissioner in Bridgetown since March 2014. It is further accredited to: Antigua and Barbuda, the Commonwealth of Dominica, Grenada, Guyana, Saint Lucia, Saint Kitts and Nevis, Saint Vincent and the Grenadines, Trinidad and Tobago, the Caribbean Community (CARICOM) and the Organisation of Eastern Caribbean States (OECS).

As fellow members of the Commonwealth of Nations, diplomatic relations between New Zealand and Barbados are at governmental level, rather than between Heads of State.  Thus, the countries exchange High Commissioners, rather than ambassadors.

List of heads of mission

High Commissioners to Barbados

Non-resident High Commissioners to Barbados, resident in Ottawa, Canada

From 1966 to 2014 located in Ottawa, Canada
 Sir Leon Götz (1966–1968)
 Dean Eyre (1968–1973)
 Jack Shepherd (1973–1976)
 Dean Eyre (1976–1980)
 Ed Latter (1980–1985)
 John Wybrow (1985–1988)
 Bruce Brown (1988–1992)
 Judith Trotter (1992–1994)
 Maurice McTigue (1994–1997)
 Jim Gerard (1997–2000)
 Wade Armstrong (2000–2003)
 Graham Kelly (2003–2006)
 Kate Lackey (2006–2010)
 Andrew Peter Needs (2010 – 2013)
 Simon Tucker (2013 – 2014)

Resident High Commissioners in Bridgetown, Barbados

 Jan Henderson (March 2014– 31 July 2018)
 Anton Ojala (14 August 2018–Present)

Footnotes

See also

List of Ambassadors and High Commissioners to and from Barbados
List of Ambassadors and High Commissioners to and from New Zealand
List of diplomatic missions in Barbados

References 

 Heads of Missions List: B.  New Zealand Ministry of Foreign Affairs and Trade.  Retrieved on 2021-21-03.

Barbados, High Commissioners from New Zealand to
 
New Zealand
Barbados and the Commonwealth of Nations
New Zealand and the Commonwealth of Nations